Kayra Aleyna Zabcı (born 21 August 2001) is a Turkish actress known for her role as the character of Oya in the series Canım Annem and presently as Seferiye Hatun in the Turkish historical series Alparslan: Büyük Selçuklu. Zabcı was born in 2001 in Istanbul, Turkey.

Early life 
Kayra Zabcı was born on 21 August 2001 in Istanbul, Turkey. She attended high school at Mimar Sinan Fine Arts High School and is currently a student at the Acting Department of the Istanbul University State Conservatory.

Career 
Zabcı started acting from the age of 12. She won first place in the 2013 Best Model Child Turkey and Best Child Model of the World competitions. She appeared in various shows and is currently starring as the female lead in the second season of the Turkish historical series Alparslan: Büyük Selçuklu. She is portraying the role of Seferiye Hatun, one of the wives of Alparslan, the second sultan of the Seljuk Empire.

Filmography

Television

Film

References

External links
 

2001 births
Living people
Turkish television actresses
21st-century Turkish actresses